In the developing heart, the atria are initially open to each other, with the opening known as the primary interatrial foramen or ostium primum (or interatrial foramen primum). The foramen lies beneath the edge of septum primum and the endocardial cushions. It progressively decreases in size as the septum grows downwards, and disappears with the formation of the atrial septum.

Structure
The foramen lies beneath the edge of septum primum and the endocardial cushions. It progressively decreases in size as the septum grows downwards, and disappears with the formation of the atrial septum.

Closure

The primary interatrial foramen is the gap between the septum primum and the septum intermedium, which gets progressively smaller until it closes.

Clinical significance
Failure of the septum primum to fuse with the endocardial cushion can lead to an ostium primum atrial septal defect. This is the second most common type of atrial septal defect and is commonly seen in Down syndrome. Typically this defect will cause a shunt to occur from the left atrium to the right atrium.  Children born with this defect may be asymptomatic, however, over time pulmonary hypertension and the resulting hypertrophy of the right side of the heart will lead to a reversal of this shunt. This reversal is called Eisenmenger syndrome.

References

External links
 
 Overview and diagram at um.edu.mt
 

Embryology of cardiovascular system